was the original title track for the twenty-eighth single, "Chokkan 2 ~Nogashita Sakana wa Ōkiizo!~", of the J-pop idol group Morning Musume, but for unannounced reasons, it was changed to the second track. Speculation has been that previews were received poorly, so to try to gain a new market of fans, it was changed to a song popular at their concerts.

Members at time of song 
 4th generation: Hitomi Yoshizawa
 5th generation: Ai Takahashi, Asami Konno, Makoto Ogawa, Risa Niigaki
 6th generation: Miki Fujimoto, Eri Kamei, Sayumi Michishige, Reina Tanaka
 7th generation: Koharu Kusumi

See also 
 Chokkan 2 ~Nogashita Sakana wa Ōkiizo!~

External links 
"Koi wa Hassō Do the Hustle!" entries on the Up-Front Works official website: CD entry, DVD entry
Koi wa Hassō Do the Hustle! lyrics at Projecthello.com

2005 songs
Morning Musume songs
Japanese-language songs
Songs written by Tsunku
Song recordings produced by Tsunku